The 1991–92 Soviet Cup was the last edition of an already non-existing political entity, the Soviet Union. 

On December 25, 1991 the President of the Soviet Union Mikhail Gorbachev announced that he resigns as president. On December 26, the Soviet of the Republics, the upper chamber of the Union's Supreme Soviet, voted the Soviet Union out of existence (the lower chamber, the Council of the Union, had been unable to work since December 12, when the recall of the Russian deputies left it without a quorum).

In the spring of 1992, all three remaining Ukrainian clubs withdrew from the competition leaving only Russian and Central Asian clubs to contest the main trophy. Because of that only one game was played during the competition's quarterfinals, while a club from Tajikistan, Pamir Dushanbe, advanced to the semifinals where it was eliminated. 

The winner of the competition, Spartak Moscow, qualified for the continental tournament representing Russia in the 1992–93 European Cup Winners' Cup.

Participating teams

Source: []
Legend
 marks clubs that took part in competitions, note, not all clubs of the First League played
Notes
 Ukrainian Polesie and Neftianik were finalists of the 1990 football cup of the Ukrainian SSR
 Dinamo Baku represented the youth center of Olympic preparation in Baku, Pardaugava Riga was based on a youth team of Latvian SSR.

Competition schedule

First preliminary round
All games took place on April 17, 1991.

|}

Second preliminary round
Games took place on July 1, 1991.

|}

Bracket

First round

|}

First games

Second games

Second round
The round started in one country, but later its postponed games were played in another.

|}

First games

Second games

Quarter-finals
Following the dissolution of the Soviet Union on December 25, 1991, clubs from around the fallen Soviet Union refused their further participation among which were Ukrainian clubs who effectively forfeiting their chances at the Cup, Belarusian Dinamo Minsk, Kazakhstani Khimik Dzhambul, and others, leaving only Pamir Dushanbe as the non-Russian club still in the competition. 

|}

Semi-finals

|}

Final

Top goalscorers

See also
 1991 Soviet Top League
 1992 Russian Top League
 1991 Soviet First League
 1993 Commonwealth of Independent States Cup

References

External links
 Calendar
 Complete calendar
 Another calendar
 Statistics

Soviet Cup seasons
Cup
Cup
Cup
Soviet Cup